Magic systems in games are the rules, limitations, abilities, and characteristics that define magic in a game.

Magic points

A magic point, sometimes known as a mana point, often abbreviated to MP, is a unit of measure that indicates either or both the amount of magic that can be utilized by a user, and the amount of energy that they can harness to perform magic. A magic point system is the most common method used to regulate and thus limit the number of spells that a magical individual can cast. Such a system gives magic users a specific amount of MP, and each spell causes a specific number of magic points to be consumed upon being cast. Many systems that use magic points assign a magic user a maximum number of MP that they can have at any one time, which is different for each magic user. There is typically a way to restore lost MP, usually by resting or imbibing potions. Sometimes consuming certain foods may replenish MP.

A few systems that use MP do not have a maximum number that may be stored, but instead make it more difficult to recover or gain new magic points.

Examples of MP-limited systems include Rolemaster, High Adventure Role Playing, GURPS, and Tunnels & Trolls.

Skill-limited

A skill-limited magic system breaks the spells down into a number of skills. To perform skills usually requires skill checks: a dice roll, modified by character statistics. The more difficult the magical effect, the higher the difficulty of the die roll. Such systems are often limited by an increase in the difficulty of the skill roll based upon the number of spells in a certain time period that have already been cast.

It is common in skill-limited systems for a spellcaster to be able to combine multiple magical skills to perform effects not covered by the skills given. Typically, such combinations are more difficult than the basic uses of the skills.

Examples of skill-limited systems include Talislanta and Ars Magica.

Spell slots
A magic system that is limited by a number of spell slots will give a spellcaster a certain number of spells per day that may be cast. These spells may be divided by level or limited to certain types of spells. When all of a spellcaster's slots are used up, the caster is no longer able to perform magic until steps are taken (usually sleeping and re-studying the spells) to recover the spell slots. This mechanic originated out of the Vancian magic system, where "the number of memorized spells is strictly limited by the magician's memory capacity in proportion to the spells' difficulty levels, effectively granting a number of spell slots".

Spell-slot systems often employ a rationale that the spell is forgotten when cast, or that the caster has a finite supply of the ingredients required to cast the spell. In the first case, the spellcaster must re-memorize the spell from a source, typically a grimoire. In the second case, the caster must find new ingredients and prepare the equipment needed to cast the spell.

For example, Dungeons & Dragons simplified Jack Vance's formula "to a number of spell slots scaling with the player character's level". HackMaster also uses a spell-slot system.

Hybrid systems
Many magic systems combine features of two or all three of the above. As an example, Mage: The Ascension uses a skill-limited system that may be augmented by spending Quintessence to lower the difficulty of a magical skill roll. Rolemaster employs a spell-point system, but includes devices called spell adders that grant additional spell shots with no associated spell-point cost. Ars Magica uses a skill-based system, but a mage can only cast so many spells before becoming too fatigued to continue. High Adventure Role Playing also uses a hybrid system between the magic point system and the skill system, and to some extent the spell slot version, which requires a skill roll based on the strength of the spell effect, limiting the total number of spells cast in a day by a magic cost system, with the caster having a certain set of magic points available each day. As in Rolemaster, there are items that can reduce the magic point cost for spells as well as items like spell adders that allow extra spells to be cast without the expenditure of magic points.

List of specific examples 

 The Magic in Dungeons & Dragons consists of spells and magic systems used in the settings of the role-playing game Dungeons & Dragons (D&D). Jack Vance's Dying Earth books provided the model for the magic system of Dungeons & Dragons, with its ideas of magic-users memorizing spells, casting them and forgetting them.
 Tunnels & Trolls introduced a magic system full of silly (and humorous) names like "Take That You Fiend!" and "Too Bad Toxin".
 Warhammer Fantasy Roleplay had a simplistic magic system and Games Workshop long promised a "Realms of Sorcery" book to correct this problem, but they rejected the complete manuscript they received from Ken Rolston. Hogshead Publishing ultimately published Realms of Sorcery (2001), which finally updated the rushed magic system in the Warhammer rulebook.
 The magic system of Nephilim was thematic but required complex calculations.
 Middle-earth Role Playing used a magic system based on Spell Law from Rolemaster.
 Palladium Fantasy Role-Playing Game featured a revised magic system from The Journey (1982).
 Beyond the Supernatural debuted Palladium's new Potential Psychic Energy (PPE) magic system as well as a system of ley-line based-geomancy.
 The second edition of HârnMaster was a simplified version of the game that extracted out the magic systems into Hârnmaster Magic (1997) and Hârnmaster Religion (1998).
 Changeling: The Dreaming'''s original magic system used "Cantrip Cards" which were sold in collectible packs.
 For the magic system of Ars Magica, all magic is based on five techniques and ten forms, and by combining those two elements (e.g., as "Creo Ignem", or Create Fire) a wizard could generate any type of spell.
 A Magical Medley (1997) included a collection of FUDGE magic systems.
 Demon City Shinjuku Role-Playing Game (2000) advanced the magic system of Big Eyes, Small Mouth.
 The magic system of Sovereign Stone expanded the game's dice-rolling system; magic could take some time to cast, so each turn a magician accumulated points toward a total until the spell finally went off.
 The Encyclopaedia Arcane series of alternative magic systems began with Demonology: The Dark Road (2001), Mongoose Publishing's first perfect-bound 64-page book.
 Mongoose's RuneQuest (2006) included a new rune magic system that required characters to quest after physical runes.
 Allomancy, Feruchemy and Hemalurgy system from Mistborn by Brandon Sanderson.
 Street Magic (2006) expanded the magic system of fourth edition Shadowrun.
 Surgebinding - a magic system from the book series The Stormlight Archive'' by Brandon Sanderson.

References

Games
Magic system